In mathematics, a congruence subgroup of a matrix group with integer entries is a subgroup defined by congruence conditions on the entries. A very simple example would be invertible 2 × 2 integer matrices of determinant 1, in which the off-diagonal entries are even. More generally, the notion of congruence subgroup can be defined for arithmetic subgroups of algebraic groups; that is, those for which we have a notion of 'integral structure' and can define reduction maps modulo an integer.

The existence of congruence subgroups in an arithmetic group provides it with a wealth of subgroups, in particular it shows that the group is residually finite. An important question regarding the algebraic structure of arithmetic groups is the congruence subgroup problem, which asks whether all subgroups of finite index are essentially congruence subgroups.

Congruence subgroups of 2×2 matrices are fundamental objects in the classical theory of modular forms; the modern theory of automorphic forms makes a similar use of congruence subgroups in more general arithmetic groups.

Congruence subgroups of the modular group 

The simplest interesting setting in which congruence subgroups can be studied is that of the modular group .

Principal congruence subgroups 

If  is an integer there is a homomorphism  induced by the reduction modulo  morphism . Explicitly it is described as follows:

The strong approximation theorem (in this case an easy consequence of the Chinese remainder theorem) implies that  is surjective, so that the quotient  is isomorphic to  Computing the order of this finite group yields the following formula for the index:

where the product is taken over all prime numbers dividing .

This implies the following result: 
If  then the principal congruence subgroups  are torsion-free. 
The group  contains  and is not torsion-free.

Definition of a congruence subgroup 

If  is a subgroup in  then it is called a congruence subgroup if there exists  such that it contains the principal congruence subgroup .

From this definition it follows that:
The congruence subgroups of level  are in one-to-one correspondence with the subgroups of

Examples 

That is,

The index is given by the formula:

where the product is taken over all prime numbers dividing .

The subgroups  are never torsion-free as they always contain the matrix .

The subgroups  are the preimage of the subgroup of unipotent matrices:

Their indices are given by the formula:

It is of index 3 and is explicitly described by:

These subgroups satisfy the following inclusions : , as well as

Properties of congruence subgroups 

The congruence subgroups of the modular group and the associated Riemann surfaces are distinguished by some particularly nice geometric and topological properties. Here is a sample:
There are only finitely many congruence covers of the modular surface which have genus zero; 
(Selberg's 3/16 theorem) If  is a nonconstant eigenfunction of the Laplace-Beltrami operator on a congruence cover of the modular surface with eigenvalue  then 

There is also a collection of distinguished operators called Hecke operators on smooth functions on congruence covers, which commute with each other and with the Laplace–Beltrami operator and are diagonalisable in each eigenspace of the latter. Their common eigenfunctions are a fundamental example of automorphic forms. Other automorphic forms associated to these congruence subgroups are the holomorphic modular forms, which can be interpreted as cohomology classes on the associated Riemann surfaces via the Eichler-Shimura isomorphism.

Normalisers of Hecke congruence subgroups 

When Ogg later heard about the monster group, he noticed that these were precisely the prime factors of the size of M, he wrote up a paper offering a bottle of Jack Daniel's whiskey to anyone who could explain this fact – this was a starting point for the theory of Monstrous moonshine, which explains deep connections between modular function theory and the monster group.

In arithmetic groups

Arithmetic groups 

Congruence subgroups 

Let  be an arithmetic group: for simplicity it is better to suppose that . As in the case of  there are reduction morphisms . They are subgroups of finite index which correspond to the subgroups of the finite groups , and the level is defined.

Examples 

Another example of arithmetic group is given by the groups  where  is the ring of integers in a number field, for example . Then if  is a prime ideal dividing a rational prime  the subgroups  which is the kernel of the reduction map mod  is a congruence subgroup since it contains the principal congruence subgroup defined by reduction modulo .

Yet another arithmetic group is the Siegel modular groups  defined by:

Property (τ) 

The family of congruence subgroups in a given arithmetic group  always has property (τ) of Lubotzky–Zimmer. This can be taken to mean that the Cheeger constant of the family of their Schreier coset graphs (with respect to a fixed generating set for ) is uniformly bounded away from zero, in other words they are a family of expander graphs. There is also a representation-theoretical interpretation: if  is a lattice in a Lie group G then property (τ) is equivalent to the non-trivial unitary representations of G occurring in the spaces  being bounded away from the trivial representation (in the Fell topology on the unitary dual of G). Property (τ) is a weakening of Kazhdan's property (T) which implies that the family of all finite-index subgroups has property (τ).

In S-arithmetic groups 

Let  be an -arithmetic group in an algebraic group .

The congruence subgroup problem

Finite-index subgroups in SL2(Z) 

The answer is a resounding "no". This fact was already known to Felix Klein and there are many ways to exhibit many non-congruence finite-index subgroups. For example: 
The simple group in the composition series of a quotient , where  is a normal congruence subgroup, must be a simple group of Lie type (or cyclic), in fact one of the groups  for a prime . But for every  there are finite-index subgroups  such that  is isomorphic to the alternating group  (for example  surjects on any group with two generators, in particular on all alternating groups, and the kernels of these morphisms give an example). These groups thus must be non-congruence. 
There is a surjection ; for  large enough the kernel of  must be non-congruence (one way to see this is that the Cheeger constant of the Schreier graph goes to 0; there is also a simple algebraic proof in the spirit of the previous item). 
On the other hand, the number  of finite index subgroups of index  in  satisfies , so most subgroups of finite index must be non-congruence.

The congruence kernel 

One can ask the same question for any arithmetic group as for the modular group:

 Naïve congruence subgroup problem: Given an arithmetic group, are all of its finite-index subgroups congruence subgroups? 

The solution by Bass–Milnor–Serre involved an aspect of algebraic number theory linked to K-theory.

This new problem is better stated in terms of certain compact topological groups associated to an arithmetic group . Both are profinite groups and there is a natural surjective morphism  (intuitively, there are fewer conditions for a Cauchy sequence to comply with in the congruence topology than in the profinite topology). The congruence kernel  is the kernel of this morphism, and the congruence subgroup problem stated above amounts to whether  is trivial. The weakening of the conclusion then leads to the following problem.

 Congruence subgroup problem: Is the congruence kernel  finite?

When the problem has a positive solution one says that  has the congruence subgroup property.

Negative solutions 

Serre's conjecture states that a lattice in a Lie group of rank one should not have the congruence subgroup property. There are three families of such groups: the orthogonal groups , the unitary groups  and the groups  (the isometry groups of a sesquilinear form over the Hamilton quaternions), plus the exceptional group  (see List of simple Lie groups). The current status of the congruence subgroup problem is as follows:
The proof uses the same argument as 2. in the case of : in the general case it is much harder to construct a surjection to  the proof is not at all uniform for all cases and fails for some lattices in dimension 7 due to the phenomenon of triality. In dimensions 2 and 3 and for some lattices in higher dimensions argument 1 and 3 also apply.
It is completely open in all remaining cases.

Positive solutions 

In many situations where the congruence subgroup problem is expected to have a positive solution it has been proven that this is indeed the case. Here is a list of algebraic groups such that the congruence subgroup property is known to hold for the associated arithmetic lattices, in case the rank of the associated Lie group (or more generally the sum of the rank of the real and p-adic factors in the case of S-arithmetic groups) is at least 2: 
Any group of type not  (for example all anisotropic forms of symplectic or orthogonal groups of real rank ); 
Outer forms of type , for example unitary groups.

The case of inner forms of type  is still open.

Congruence groups and adèle groups 

The ring of adeles  is the restricted product of all completions of  i.e.

where the product is over the set  of all primes,  is the field of p-adic numbers and an element  belongs to the restricted product if and only if for almost all primes ,  belongs to the subring  of p-adic integers. 

Given any algebraic group  over  the adelic algebraic group  is well-defined. The finite adèles are the restricted product of all non-archimedean completions (all p-adic fields).

These remarks are also valid for S-arithmetic subgroups, replacing the ring of finite adèles with the restricted product over all primes not in S.

More generally one can define what it means for a subgroup  to be a congruence subgroup without explicit reference to a fixed arithmetic subgroup, by asking that it be equal to its congruence closure  Thus it becomes possible to study all congruence subgroups at once by looking at the discrete subgroup  This is especially convenient in the theory of automorphic forms: for example all modern treatments of the Arthur-Selberg trace formula are done in this adélic setting.

Notes

References

Modular forms
Discrete groups